Paula J. Olsiewski is an American biochemist who is a Contributing Scholar at the Johns Hopkins Center for Health Security. She was a Program Director at the Alfred P. Sloan Foundation, where she created and directed the Foundation’s programs in the Microbiology of the Built Environment, the Chemistry of Indoor Environments and Civic Initiatives.  She directed the Biosecurity program until its conclusion in 2011 and the Synthetic Biology program until its conclusion in 2014.

Education
Olsiewski holds a bachelor's degree in chemistry from Yale College, and a Doctor of Philosophy in biological chemistry from the Massachusetts Institute of Technology (1979) with a thesis on D-amino acid dehydrogenase evolution, supervised by Christopher T. Walsh.  From 1980-1982 she was a Postdoctoral Fellow in the lab of William H. Beers at New York University.

Biotech and biomedical commercial development
Olsiewski directed commercial development  for in vitro diagnostic products at Enzo Biochem,  (NYSE:ENZ), a  biotechnology company focused on the manipulation and modification of nucleic acids to produce therapeutic and diagnostic products.  She directed the New York City Biotechnology Initiative, a state funded program  to improve the region's ability to grow biotechnology companies by fostering relationships between industry and academia.  She also established and directed the Technology Development Office at the Hospital for Special Surgery.

Board and advisory committee roles 
Olsiewski is Chair of the Board of Scientific Counselors Homeland Security Research Subcommittee at the U.S. Environmental Protection Agency, and on the Board of Directors at the Critical Path Institute. In 2001 she served on the Board of Advisors for the WMD Center’s Bio-Response Report Card.[6] From 2003-2009 she was a member of the MIT Corporation. She was the first alumna to serve as President of the MIT Alumni Association (2003-2004), and served on the Advisory Board of the MIT Initiative on Faculty Race and Diversity[7] (2008-2009). She was a member of the Committee on Advances in Technology and the Prevention of Their Application to Next Generation Biowarfare Threats, which produced the National Research Counsel Report “Globalization, Biosecurity, and the Future of Life Sciences”[8] (2006). From 2005-2012 she served on the advisory board for the National Consortium for the Study of Terrorism and Responses to Terrorism (START).

Selected writings & publications
 Haynie, Sharon L.; Hinkle, Amber S.; Jones, Nancy L.; Martin, Cheryl A.; Olsiewski, Paula J.; Roberts, Mary F. (2011). “Reflections on the Journey: Six Short Stories.” Chemistry Central Journal, 5 (69): 1-12. doi: 10.1186/1752-153X-5-69
Her most cited papers, according to Google Scholar:

Awards and honors 
In 1995, Olsiewski won the MIT Henry B. Kane '24 Award, which is given in recognition of exception service and accomplishments in the area of fundraising. In 2000, she received the MIT Bronze Beaver Alumni Award, which is given in recognition of distinguished service - it is the highest honor the Alumni Association bestows upon any of its members. Also in 2000, she received the Yale Class Distinguished Service Award, which is selected by the class leadership and bestowed to recognize and thank classmates who have dedicated time, energy and enthusiasm to the Class. In 2018, Olsiewski was elected as a AAAS Fellow in the Chemical Sciences division. In 2022, the International Society of Indoor Air Quality and Climate inducted Olsiewski as a new Academy Fellow  and awarded her their Special Award ″in recognition of her advocacy and support of basic research
for the microbiology and chemistry of the indoor environment.″

References 

Year of birth missing (living people)
Living people
American women biochemists
Yale College alumni
Massachusetts Institute of Technology School of Science alumni
Synthetic biologists
American women scientists
American scientists
21st-century American women